Jerome Propheter is a German footballer who plays as a defender for Rot-Weiß Oberhausen.

Club career

FC Junkersdorf 
In 2008, Propheter joined local club FC Jukersdorf. He left them in 2011.

Viktoria Köln 
In 2011, he joined Regionalliga West and home city side, Viktoria Köln. He made his debut on 19 August 2012 in 4-2 home win over FC Schalke 04 II. Propheter scored his first ever goal in 0-3 away win over Borussia Mönchengladbach II on 22 September 2012, scoring in the 74th minute.

Arminia Bielefeld 
On 1 July 2013, Propheter successfully joined 3. Liga side Arminia Bielefeld on a free transfer. His debut came over a year later in August 2014, coming on for Julian Börner in the 85th minute against MSV Duisburg.

Rot-Weiss Essen 
On 18 January 2014, Propheter completed a loan move to Rot-Weiss Essen that lasted 5 months. His debut several days later 2-3 home loss to SC Wiedenbrück 2000. His first goal came in a 4-0 win over SSVg Velbert. On 30 June 2014, he returned to Arminia Bielefeld.

Alemannia Aachen 
On 1 July 2015, Propheter signed for Regionalliga West side Alemannia Aachen.

References

External links
 

1990 births
Living people
German footballers
Arminia Bielefeld players
Rot-Weiss Essen players
Alemannia Aachen players
FSV Wacker 90 Nordhausen players
Rot-Weiß Oberhausen players
3. Liga players
Regionalliga players
Association football central defenders
Footballers from Cologne